Candy is a song recorded by American Pop artist, Jessica Sutta, for her debut mixtape Feline Resurrection. It was released on November 20, 2014 as a video on YouTube in America as the sixth single from the album.

Background 
“Candy” is most definitely the song that you should have your favourite club’s DJ playing when you’re already tipsy and ready to make a move on the person you’ve been eyeing all night long. “I worked on the song with two very talented and great people, Lil Eddie, who has incredible penmanship and a true ear for melodies, and S-X, my 21-year-old super producer. We sat in the studio and the energy was vibrating with a beautiful creative flow and we didn’t leave until we had created some sexy, delicious, yummy candy”, said Jessica about the story behind "Candy" in a recent interview. It's a sexy song about falling in love in the club, and giving your all on the dancefloor.

Music video 
The video starts out with Sutta in a dark blue background then goes to Sutta dancing with a pole. The next scene then shows Sutta in red with a gumball machine in front of her and shows a blue piece of candy with a person inside it. Sutta then is seen dancing with the pole (which looks like a candy cane) and is dancing again while singing the first verse, she is also seen on a mint going in a circle. Afterwards, the girl comes out of the candy wrapper. Jessica then smashes the gumball machine and starts dancing with a little bit on the girl from the wrapper. Sutta is later seen on a candy cane in a sexy red outfit swinging back and forth with a lipstick sucker singing the second verse. Closer to the bridge of the song, Sutta has a car made of candy with the wheels and tires made of suckers and the doors made of cotton candy and the front made of candy. The video ends with Jessica Sutta making a heart with her hands.

References

External links 

2014 singles
2014 songs
Hollywood Records singles
Songs written by Lil' Eddie
Songs written by Jessica Sutta